Hugh Morrison (born c. 1852) was a Scottish professional golfer who played in the late 19th century. Morrison tied for ninth place in the 1875 Open Championship.

Early life
Morrison was born in Scotland circa 1852. Little is known about his life other than his ninth place finish in the 1875 Open Championship.

Golf career

1875 Open Championship
The 1875 Open Championship was the 15th Open Championship, held 10 September at Prestwick Golf Club in Prestwick, South Ayrshire, Scotland. Willie Park, Sr. won the Championship by two strokes from runner-up Bob Martin. Willie Park, who had won the first Championship in 1860, equalled Tom Morris, Jr.'s record of four Championship wins.  Morrison had rounds of 62-59-62=183 but won no prize money for his effort.

Death
Morrison's date of death is unknown.

References

Scottish male golfers